Gurasada is a commune in Hunedoara County, Transylvania, Romania. This region is situated at the junction of the Transylvania and Banat historical provinces. Its neighbours are the communes of Zam, Ilia Dobra, Burjuc. The commune is composed of eleven villages: Boiu de Jos (Alsóboj), Boiu de Sus (Felsőboj), Cărmăzănești (Karmazinesd), Câmpuri de Sus (Kimpur), Câmpuri-Surduc (Kimpényszurduk), Dănulești (Danulesd), Gothatea (Gothátya), Gurasada, Runcșor (Runksor), Ulieș (Ullyes) and Vica (Vika).

Although its surface is not very large, an important variety of rocks constituents can be found. The variety of the landform is one of the most interesting attraction of this territory.

Gurasada is known for its churches: The church from Gurasada, the main village, is an Orthodox one, and the painting from inside the bell-tower is dated in 1765, in the 18th century, when the church was painted again.  This church is situated on the main road between Deva and Arad.  There are also old churches in some villages of Gurasada: the old church from Dănulești, made of wood, the old church from Carmazănești, the church from Gothatea, made of wood.

In communal area there is a natural reservation with horned vipers. There is a cavern in Boiu with a number of 27 natural cavities explored between 1976-1978. 
A park with very rare tree species: tulip trees, Canadian pine, shrubs and bushes, a bamboo plantation and other species, 175 – 200 years old oak trees.  
In this area there are two important quarries for exploitation of chalkstone.

Photos

References

Communes in Hunedoara County
Localities in Transylvania